Verdades Secretas (English: Hidden Truths) is a Brazilian telenovela created by Walcyr Carrasco and directed by Mauro Mendonça Filho and Amora Mautner. Produced and broadcast by TV Globo, it premiered on 8 June 2015. The telenovela was the first original production in the 11 pm timeslot, having all its four predecessors being primarily remakes. It was also the first Globoplay original telenovela, starting with its second season. The first season stars Camila Queiroz, Rodrigo Lombardi, Drica Moraes, Marieta Severo, Reynaldo Gianecchini, Grazi Massafera, Agatha Moreira, and Rainer Cadete. Rômulo Estrela, Gabriel Braga Nunes, Maria de Medeiros, Deborah Evelyn, Ícaro Silva, Sérgio Guizé, and Júlia Byrro join the main cast in the second season.

In 2020, the telenovela was renewed for a second season, which premiered on Globoplay on 20 October 2021, and concluded on 17 December 2021. The season is expected to air on TV Globo in 2023. In October 2021, the telenovela was renewed for a third season, which is expected to premiere in 2023. In May 2022, Globo, shelved plans of producing the third season, ending its run after two seasons.

Plot

Season 1 (2015) 
Arlete (Camila Queiroz) is a beautiful young girl full of dreams. She arrives in São Paulo willing to become a model, but she ends up working as a luxury prostitute under the stage name "Angel". Hit by the needs that life imposes, Angel cannot overcome the traps disguised as opportunities, allowing herself to be taken by an obscure reality, which goes far beyond the catwalks. This is when Alex (Rodrigo Lombardi), a powerful, rich, seductive, and experienced man, comes into her life. They eventually end up being in love with each other as they start a relationship. Aiming to be even closer to Angel, Alex fakes his love towards Angel's mother, Carolina (Drica Moraes), and marries her. Later on, Carolina learns about Angel and Alex's affair and commits suicide in disgust. In order to avenge her mother's death, Angel kills Alex and throws his corpse into the sea. She later marries Guilherme (Gabriel Leone), her old boyfriend from the modeling agency.

Season 2 (2021) 
Years after Alex's death, Guilherme dies in a mysterious accident. With no money and an ill son left to raise, Angel decides to start modeling again. Giovanna (Agatha Moreira), Alex's daughter, returns from Paris, believing that Angel murdered both Guilherme and her father, whose corpse was never found. In order to prove Alex's death and take possession of her family's inheritance, Giovanna is willing to do anything to find evidence that proves that Angel killed her father. She hires Cristiano (Rômulo Estrela), a charming private investigator, with whom she gets involved with. Aiming to get closer to Angel and be able to investigate her, Cristiano decides to pose as a model and infiltrate the world of fashion; however, once he meets Angel, he ends up being in love with her.

Cast

Main 
 Camila Queiroz as Arlete "Angel" Brito Gomes
 Rodrigo Lombardi as Alexandre "Alex" Ticiano (season 1; guest season 2)
 Drica Moraes as Carolina Brito (season 1)
 Marieta Severo as Fanny Richard / Rita de Cássia (season 1)
 Reynaldo Gianecchini as Anthony Mariano (season 1)
 Grazi Massafera as Larissa Ramos (season 1)
 Agatha Moreira as Giovanna "Kika" Lovatelli Ticiano
 Rainer Cadete as Visky
 Guilhermina Guinle as Pia Lovatelli (season 1; recurring season 2)
 Gabriel Leone as Guilherme Lovatelli (season 1; guest season 2)
 João Vítor Silva as Bruno Lovatelli Ticiano (season 2; recurring season 1)
 Rômulo Estrela as Cristiano Valença (season 2)
 Gabriel Braga Nunes as Percival "Percy" Biancchini (season 2)
 Maria de Medeiros as Blanche LaBelle (season 2)
 Deborah Evelyn as Betty (season 2)
 Ícaro Silva as Joseph (season 2)
 Sérgio Guizé as Ariel Nolasco (season 2)
 Júlia Byrro as Lara "Lua" Cunha (season 2)

Recurring

Introduced in season one 
 Dida Camero as Lourdes "Lourdeca" Lima
 Adriano Toloza as Igor Lovatelli
 Ana Lúcia Torre as Hilda Brito (season 1)
 Bel Kutner as Darlene Brito (season 1)
 Eva Wilma as Fábia Mariano (season 1)
 Genézio de Barros as Oswaldo Moreira (season 1)
 Felipe Carolis as Sam Nunes (season 1)
 Alessandra Ambrósio as Samia (season 1)
 Yasmin Brunet as Stephanie Prates (season 1)
 Jessica Córes as Lyris Monteiro (season 1)
 Rhaisa Batista as Mayra Chagas (season 1)
 Flávio Tolezani as Roy (season 1)
 Fernando Eiras as Maurice Argent (season 1)
 Tarcísio Filho as Rogério Gomes (season 1)
 Laryssa Dias as Viviane Gomes (season 1)
 Mouhamed Harfouch as Everaldo Ramirez (season 1)
 Gláucio Gomes as Robério Sá (season 1)
 Raphael Sander as Léo (season 1)
 Felipe Hintze as Eziel (season 1)
 Bella Piero as Nina (season 1)
 Pedro Gabriel Tonini as Edgard (season 1)
 Nathália Rodrigues as Estela (season 1)
 Ana Barroso as Divanilda Ramos (season 1)
 Mariana Molina as Patrícia (season 1)
 Christian Villegas as Daniel de Freitas (season 1)
 Giuliano Lafayette as Caco (season 1)
 Raphael Ghanem as Dudu (season 1)
 Sylbeth Soriano as Leidiana (season 1)
 Fernanda Heras as Eunice (season 1)
 João Cunha as Joel Aguiar (season 1)
 Maria Eduarda Miliante as Yasmin Gomes (season 1)
 Yaçanã Martins as Sabina (season 1)
 Werles Pajero as Raulino (season 1)

Introduced in season two 
 Bernardo Lessa as Fabrício (season 2)
 Luciana Fernandes as Nalva (season 2)
 Maria Luísa Mendonça as Araídes Cunha (season 2)
 Erika Januza as Laila Nolasco (season 2)
 Rhay Polster as Chiara (season 2)
 Paula Burlamaqui as Aline (season 2)
 Gabriel Vieira as Tadeu (season 2)
 Mayara Russi as Vitória (season 2)
 Iza Moreira as Giulia (season 2)
 Clara Choveaux as Tânia (season 2)
 Kelner Macêdo as Mark (season 2)
 Rodrigo Pandolfo as Benjamin "Benji" Nunes (season 2)
 Johnny Massaro as Giotto (season 2)
 Julia Stockler as Irina (season 2)
 Celso Frateschi as Lorenzo (season 2)
 Bruno Montaleone as Matheus (season 2)
 Zezé Polessa as Berta (season 2)
 Jonathan Azevedo as Eurípedes (season 2)
 Aline Borges as Thaís (season 2)
 Eduardo Reyes as Edney (season 2)
 Julio Machado as Nicolau (season 2)
 Daniel Andrade as Lúcio DeSantis (season 2)
 Giovana Echeverria as Lisa (season 2)
 Malu Ogata as Reiko (season 2)
 Ângelo Antônio as Visky's father (season 2)

Guest stars

Introduced in season one 
 Kíria Malheiros as young Carolina Brito (season 1)
 Camila Mayrink as Bel (season 1)
 Maurício Branco as Dante (season 1)
 Fernanda Tavares as herself (season 1)
 Ana Paula Botelho as Chambermaid (season 1)
 Alexia Dechamps as Lídice (season 1)
 Álamo Facó as Emanoel (season 1)
 Martha Meola as Silvia (season 1)
 Giulio Lopes as Renato (season 1)

Introduced in season two 
 Hugo Gloss as himself (season 2)

Episodes

Reception 
In Brazil, the telenovela was broadcast in the 11:00 pm time slot and recorded an average 43% share and more than 18 million viewers. It was one of the most successful telenovelas of TV Globo in recent times, having achieved a viewership rating of 19.81 (20) points, the highest, despite its 11 pm timeslot. It was also widely commented on Twitter, while being broadcast, generating more than three million comments. The #verdadessecretas (original title of the telenovela) hashtag was the most used, with 2,817,827 mentions. In second place was #angel, the name young Arlete uses after entering into the fashion world. The telenovela's finale garnered more than one million mentions.

Verdades Secretas received praise from critics, and was prized as Best Telenovela at the 44th International Emmy Awards, becoming the fifth telenovela of TV Globo to win the category in a row. The telenovela also received nomination for Best Actress for Grazi Massafera performance.

Ratings 

On a consolidated basis, the debut of the plot registered 22.9 (23) points, same as the 9 pm telenovela Babilônia. The next day scored 20.2 points. In its third episode, Verdades Secretas scored 19 points. Record viewership took place on 22 June, when it recorded 24 rating points in Greater São Paulo. On 6 July, the show peaked at 30 points rating, closing with average of 26 (25.5) that week. In its last week it hit a record audience on 21 July with 27 points almost surpassing the telenovela A Regra do Jogo. Sometimes higher viewer ratings than the Jornal Nacional, as on 27 July, when the plot registered an average of 25 points against 24 of the newspaper.

In its penultimate episode, the telenovela aired from 11:30 pm to 12:37 am, despite being displayed later time than schedule, it scored average 24.3 points. On the last episode scored 27 points, its highest ratings since its debut.

Awards and nominations

DVD release 
In June 2016, Globo Marcas released a DVD of an edited version of the telenovela, consisting of 25 episodes.

References

External links 
  
 

2015 telenovelas
2015 Brazilian television series debuts
Brazilian LGBT-related television shows
Modeling-themed television series
Brazilian telenovelas
Prostitution in Brazilian television
TV Globo telenovelas
Telenovelas by Walcyr Carrasco
Television shows set in São Paulo
Portuguese-language telenovelas
International Emmy Award for Best Telenovela